Jawad is a Tehsil and a Nagar Panchayat in Neemuch district in the Indian state of Madhya Pradesh.

There are six towns and 105 villages in Jawad.

Demographics

As of the 2011 Census of India, Jawad had a population of 17,129. Males constitute 51% of the population and females 49%. Jawad has an average literacy rate of 70%, higher than the national average of 59.5%: male literacy is 80%, and female literacy is 59%. In Jawad, 11.5% of the population is under 6 years of age.

People from Jawad
 Virendra Kumar Saklecha
 Satyanarayan Jatiya
 Om Prakash Sakhlecha

References

Cities and towns in Neemuch district